Maria Andrade Teixeira (born 19 March 1993) is a Cape Verdean taekwondo athlete.

She competed at the 2016 Summer Olympics in Rio de Janeiro in the women's 49 kg, where she lost to Panipak Wongpattanakit in the preliminaries. She was the flag bearer for Cape Verde during the Parade of Nations and the closing ceremony.

References

External links

1993 births
Living people
Cape Verdean female taekwondo practitioners
Olympic taekwondo practitioners of Cape Verde
Taekwondo practitioners at the 2016 Summer Olympics
African Taekwondo Championships medalists